Za'Darius Smith (born September 8, 1992) is an American football outside linebacker for the Minnesota Vikings of the National Football League (NFL). He played college football at Kentucky, and was selected by the Baltimore Ravens in the fourth round of the 2015 NFL Draft.

Early years
Smith attended Greenville High School in Greenville, Alabama. Smith played basketball in high school and did not start playing football until his senior year.

College career
Smith played college football for two years at East Mississippi Community College before transferring to the University of Kentucky. In his two years at East Mississippi, he recorded 66 tackles and 11 sacks. In his first year at Kentucky, Smith started all 12 games and recorded 59 tackles and six sacks, which ranked seventh in the SEC. As a senior in 2014, Smith had 60 tackles and 4.5 sacks.

Collegiate statistics

Professional career
On January 17, 2015, Smith appeared in the 2015 East–West Shrine Game and recorded two combined tackles and one sack to help the East defeat the West 19–3. Smith was recognized as the most valuable defensive player in the East-West Shrine Game. Smith subsequently received a LB invitation to the 2015 Senior Bowl. On January 24, 2015, Smith appeared in the Reese's Senior Bowl and helped the North team defeat the South 34–13. At the conclusion of the pre-draft process, Smith was projected to be a third or fourth round pick by NFL draft experts and scouts. He was ranked as the 12th best defensive end prospect by DraftScout.com.

Baltimore Ravens
The Baltimore Ravens selected Smith in the fourth round (122nd overall) of the 2015 NFL Draft. Smith was the 17th defensive end drafted in 2015. The pick used to draft him was acquired during a trade with the Detroit Lions in exchange for Haloti Ngata.

2015
On May 8, 2015, the Baltimore Ravens signed Smith to a four-year, $2.76 million contract that includes a signing bonus of $483,152.

Smith entered training camp as a backup outside linebacker. Head coach John Harbaugh named Smith the backup weakside linebacker, behind Terrell Suggs, to start the regular season.

On September 20, 2015, Smith made his professional regular season debut during a 37–33 loss at the Oakland Raiders and made one solo tackle. On October 1, 2015, Smith recorded a season-high four solo tackles and made a season-high two sacks during a 23–20 overtime win at the Pittsburgh Steelers. Smith made his first career sack on Steelers’ quarterback Michael Vick for a six-yard loss during the third quarter and would also sack him on the next play.
As a rookie in 2015, Smith played 15 games with 30 tackles, 5.5 sacks, and 2 pass defended.

2016
In the 2016 season, he played in 13 games and started four. He recorded one pass defensed, one forced fumble, one sack, 20 tackles, and four quarterback hits.

2017
In the 2017 season, he appeared in 14 games and started four. He recorded one pass defensed, one forced fumble, 3.5 sacks, 24 tackles, and 16 quarterback hits.

2018
In the 2018 season, he appeared in 16 games and started eight. In Week 6 of the 2018 season, Smith recorded three sacks, which was part of the new team record 11 sacks, in a 21–0 win over the Tennessee Titans, earning him AFC Defensive Player of the Week. He finished the season with career-highs with 45 combined tackles, 8.5 sacks, two passes defensed and a forced fumble. He led the Ravens in sacks and finished sixth on the team in tackles.

Green Bay Packers

2019
On March 14, 2019, Smith signed a four-year, $66 million contract with the Green Bay Packers.
In Smith's debut as a Packer in week 1, he made 3 tackles and sacked Mitchell Trubisky once in the 10–3 win over the Chicago Bears.
In week 6 against the Detroit Lions, Smith recorded a sack on Matthew Stafford in the 23–22 win.
In week 8 against the Kansas City Chiefs, Smith sacked Matt Moore twice in the 31–24 win.
In week 12 against the San Francisco 49ers, Smith recorded a team high 6 tackles and sacked Jimmy Garoppolo once in the 37–8 loss. In week 16 against the Minnesota Vikings, Smith sacked Kirk Cousins 3.5 times during the 23–10 win. Smith finished the regular season with a career high 13.5 sacks.

In the Divisional Round of the playoffs against the Seattle Seahawks, Smith recorded 2 sacks on Russell Wilson during the 28–23 win.

2020
In Week 3 of the 2020 season against the New Orleans Saints, Smith forced a fumble on Taysom Hill that was recovered by the Packers during the 37–30 win.
In Week 4 against the Atlanta Falcons, Smith sacked Matt Ryan three times during the 30–16 win.
Smith was named the NFC Defensive Player of the Week for his performance in Week 4.
In Week 12 against the Chicago Bears, Smith recorded a strip sack on Mitchell Trubisky that was recovered and returned for a touchdown by teammate Preston Smith during the 41–25 win. On December 21, 2020, he was selected for the 2021 Pro Bowl. On January 8, 2021, he made the 2020 All-Pro Team second team.

2021
On July 28, 2021, Smith reported to Packers' training camp with a back injury, and the team placed him on the Non-Football Injury list (NFI). He practiced sparingly during camp, but assured fans that he would be ready for the Packers' Week 1 game with the New Orleans Saints. Smith played just 18 snaps during the 3–38 loss, behind second-year teammate Jonathan Garvin, and was called for a roughing the passer penalty that negated a Darnell Savage interception. On September 17, Smith was placed on injured reserve with the same back injury that nagged him throughout training camp. During the week of September 27, Smith underwent back surgery and was ruled out indefinitely. The Packers expressed hope he would be back at some point during the season. On October 29, Smith posted on Twitter that he was back in Green Bay and "can't wait to get back on the field!" Despite that, head coach Matt LaFleur cautioned that their staff were hopeful but would have to "get him back in the building and see where he's at." On January 12, 2022, the Packers opened the practice window for Smith. On January 22, Smith, along with fellow linebacker Whitney Mercilus, were officially activated off injured reserve ahead of the Packers' first playoff game in the Divisional Round against the San Francisco 49ers. 

On March 14, 2022, Smith was released by the Packers.

Minnesota Vikings
On March 22, 2022, Smith signed a three-year, $42 million contract with the Minnesota Vikings, reuniting him with Mike Pettine and Mike Smith.

For the month of October, Smith was named the NFC Defensive Player of the month with 14 tackles, 6.5 sacks, eight tackles for loss, and a pass breakup. In Week 8, Smith had seven tackles, three sacks, four tackles for loss, and a pass breakup in a 34–26 win over the Arizona Cardinals, earning NFC Defensive Player of the Week.

Legal troubles
On September 29, 2019, Smith was cited by the Racine County Sheriff's Office for possession of marijuana and speeding in a construction zone. Smith and teammates Rashan Gary and Kingsley Keke were returning to Green Bay from Chicago when a deputy stopped them for driving 81 mph in a 60-mph construction zone near the intersection of Interstate 94 and Highway 20 in the town of Mount Pleasant. The deputy smelled the odor of marijuana in the vehicle and searched it, discovering three blunts and a THC vaping cartridge in a duffel bag in the rear of the vehicle. None of the men appeared to be high or had any drugs or paraphernalia on their persons when searched, but all three were briefly placed in handcuffs, questioned separately, and then released after Smith admitted to ownership of the paraphernalia, as well as to smoking marijuana before leaving Chicago. Smith cooperated with the officer throughout the incident, and hired a lawyer who entered a plea of not guilty on both charges. On July 30, 2020, the Racine County prosecutor dismissed the charges.

NFL career statistics

Regular season

Postseason

References

External links
Minnesota Vikings bio
Kentucky Wildcats bio

1992 births
Living people
Players of American football from Montgomery, Alabama
American football defensive ends
American football outside linebackers
East Mississippi Lions football players
Kentucky Wildcats football players
Baltimore Ravens players
Green Bay Packers players
Minnesota Vikings players
National Conference Pro Bowl players